U-72 may refer to one of the following German submarines:

 , a Type UE I submarine launched in 1915 and that served in World War I until scuttled on 1 November 1918
 During World War I, Germany also had these submarines with similar names:
 , a Type UB III submarine launched in 1917 and sunk on 12 May 1918
 , a Type UC II submarine launched in 1916 and went missing after 21 August 1917
 , a Type VIIC submarine that served in World War II until scuttled on 2 May 1945

Submarines of Germany